Premee Mohamed is an Indo-Caribbean scientist and speculative fiction author based in Edmonton, Alberta. She also works as Social Media Manager and Associate Editor for Escape Pod.

Mohamed received her undergraduate degree in molecular genetics in 2002, and also holds a degree in environmental science.

Works
Mohamed initially wrote for herself. Beneath the Rising was her tenth or eleventh novel, and was written between 2000 and 2002, but she only submitted it for publication in 2016, after writing a short story that was accepted for an anthology in 2015. Since then, Mohamed's short stories have appeared in many magazines and anthologies. Her short story Willing was nominated in 2017 for the Pushcart Prize.
The Annual Migration of Clouds won the 2022 Aurora Award for Best Novelette/Novella. It was also a finalist for the Georges Bugnet Award for Fiction and the Robert Kroetsch City of Edmonton Book Prize.

Novels
Beneath the Rising trilogy:
 Beneath the Rising (2020) – finalist for the Crawford Award, the Aurora Awards, the British Fantasy Award, and the Locus Award
 A Broken Darkness (2021)
 The Void Ascendant (2022)

Novellas
 ‘These Lifeless Things’ (2021)
 ‘And What Can We Offer You Tonight’ (2021), winner of the Nebula Award for Best Novella, and the World Fantasy Award
 ‘The Annual Migration of Clouds’ (2021)

Collections
 No One Will Come Back for Us and Other Stories (upcoming, 2023)

References

External links
 

Living people
Speculative fiction writers
Women science fiction and fantasy writers
Year of birth missing (living people)
Nebula Award winners
Canadian women scientists